The 1987–88 Full Members' Cup was the third edition of the tournament created to compensate for the ban on English clubs from European football following the Heysel Stadium disaster. It was won by Reading, who beat Luton Town 4–1 in the final at Wembley.

Arsenal, Liverpool, Manchester United & Tottenham opted out of this competition.

First round

Second round

Third round

Quarter-final

Semi-final

Final

External links
 First round
 Second round
 Third round
 Quarter-final
 Semi-final
 Final

Full Members' Cup
Full